Suravaram is one of the Indian surnames:

 Suravaram Pratapareddy was a social historian from the Telangana region of Andhra Pradesh, India. 
 Suravaram Sudhakar Reddy is a member of the 12th and 14th Lok Sabha of India and represents the Nalgonda. 
 

Indian surnames